The Youth Risk Behavior Surveillance System (YRBSS) is an American biennial survey of adolescent health risk and health protective behaviors such as smoking, drinking, drug use, diet, and physical activity conducted  by the Centers for Disease Control and Prevention.  It surveys students in grades 9–12. It is one of the major sources of information about these risk behaviors, and is used by federal agencies to track drug use, sexual behavior, and other risk behaviors.

The YRBSS was created in 1990 in order to monitor progress towards protecting youth from HIV infection.  There are only two repeated nationally-representative surveys which give all the information in existence about youth risk behavior;  YRBSS and the University of Michigan's Monitoring the Future (MTF).  Every academic research study which evaluates national US trends over time in adolescent smoking, drinking, drug use, sexual activity, or other health behaviors is based on these two studies. There are no other nationally-representative sources of information about these behaviors other than YRBSS and MTF.

The YRBSS is the official source of information about adolescent risk behaviors used to evaluate federal, state, and local public health initiatives to decrease these risk behaviors.

See also

 National Longitudinal Study of Adolescent to Adult Health

References

External links 
 https://www.cdc.gov/HealthyYouth/yrbs/index.htm
 Youth Risk Behavior Surveillance System homepage

Adolescence
Centers for Disease Control and Prevention